The Unionist Movement (Movimiento Unionista) was a center-left political party in Colombia. 
At the last legislative elections, 10 March 2002, the party won as one of the many small parties parliamentary representation. 

Left-wing parties in Colombia
Political parties in Colombia